William J. Garsoe (December 9, 1917 – May 23, 1986) was an American politician from Maine. Garsoe, a Republican, served four terms (1973 to 1980) in the Maine House of Representatives from the town of Cumberland. During his third term in office, Garsoe was elected Assistant Minority Leader. During his fourth and final term, Garsoe was Minority Leader.

Garsoe served in the Air Corps as Captain during World War II. Garsoe raised carnations as the owner of Sunnyside Greenhouses from 1946 to 1972.

References

1917 births
1986 deaths
People from Cumberland, Maine
Minority leaders of the Maine House of Representatives
Businesspeople from Maine
20th-century American businesspeople
20th-century American politicians